Susan Jones (born 19 September 1954) is a British former swimmer. 

Jones competed in the women's 800 metre freestyle at the 1972 Summer Olympics.

References

External links
 

1954 births
Living people
British female swimmers
Olympic swimmers of Great Britain
Swimmers at the 1972 Summer Olympics
Place of birth missing (living people)
British female freestyle swimmers
People educated at Millfield
20th-century British women